Tetramoera is a genus of moths belonging to the subfamily Olethreutinae of the family Tortricidae.

Species
Tetramoera calligrapha (Meyrick, 1912)
Tetramoera flavescens Kuznetsov, 1988
Tetramoera gracilistria (Turner, 1946)
Tetramoera isogramma (Meyrick, 1908)
Tetramoera leptalea Diakonoff, 1988
Tetramoera paragramma (Meyrick, 1909)
Tetramoera schistaceana (Snellen, 1891)

See also
List of Tortricidae genera

References

External links
tortricidae.com

Enarmoniini
Tortricidae genera
Taxa named by Alexey Diakonoff